Zhou Chao (born 12 January 1987) is a Chinese judoka.

She competed at the 2016 Summer Olympics in Rio de Janeiro, in the women's 70 kg.

References

External links
 
 

1987 births
Living people
Olympic judoka of China
Judoka at the 2016 Summer Olympics
Chinese female judoka
Sportspeople from Handan
21st-century Chinese women